The 14th Annual British Academy Television Craft Awards were presented by the British Academy of Film and Television Arts (BAFTA) on 28 April 2013, with Stephen Mangan presiding over the event. The awards were held at The Brewery, City of London, and given in recognition of technical achievements in British television of 2012.

Winners and nominees
Winners are listed first and highlighted in boldface; the nominees are listed below alphabetically and not in boldface.

Notes

A: The BAFTA website does not list the individual names of the writers for The Thick of It. The writing team consists of:  Jesse Armstrong, Simon Blackwell, Roger Drew, Sean Gray, Armando Iannucci, Ian Martin, Will Smith and Tony Roche.

See also
British Academy Television Awards 2013

References

External links
British Academy Craft Awards official website

British Academy Television Craft Awards
British Academy Television Craft Awards
British Academy Television Craft Awards
British Academy Television Craft Awards
British Academy Television Craft Awards